Kurt Redel (8 October 1918 in Breslau, Silesia, now Wrocław – 12 February 2013 in Munich) was a German flautist and conductor.

Early life
Redel studied flute, violin, conducting, and composition, as well as music history and piano at the Breslau Conservatory. He worked as a solo flutist for the Meininger Landeskapelle (1938/39), Salzburg Mozarteum (1939/41, where he was also awarded a professorship) and Bavarian State Orchestra/Opera (1941/45). Between 1946 and 1953/56 he taught at the Northwest German Music Academy in Detmold.

Pro Arte Orchestra
In 1953 he founded the (Munich) Pro Arte Chamber Orchestra with which he made numerous recordings of works of Baroque, Classical and later periods. He founded the Lourdes Festival and was its director for 20 years.

Redel died on 12 February 2013. He was 94 years old.

References

External links
 
 Kurt Redel at Discogs
 

1918 births
2013 deaths
German male conductors (music)
Musicians from Wrocław
Officers Crosses of the Order of Merit of the Federal Republic of Germany
Academic staff of the Hochschule für Musik Detmold
20th-century German conductors (music)
20th-century German male musicians
Commandeurs of the Ordre des Arts et des Lettres
20th-century flautists